Sihlau  is a railway station in the Sihl Valley, and the municipality of Adliswil, in the Swiss Canton of Zürich. The station is on the Sihltal line, which is operated by the Sihltal Zürich Uetliberg Bahn (SZU). It takes its name from the nearby settlement of Sihlau.

The station is served by the following passenger trains:

References 

Railway stations in the canton of Zürich